Toma Reiter is a male former international table tennis player from Romania.

He won a bronze medal at the 1956 World Table Tennis Championships in the mixed doubles with Ella Zeller.

In addition he was also part of the Romanian team that won a bronze in the Swaythling Cup (men's team event).

See also
 List of table tennis players
 List of World Table Tennis Championships medalists

References

Romanian male table tennis players
World Table Tennis Championships medalists